Antar Djemaouni (born August 29, 1987) is an Algerian football player. He is currently playing for AS Khroub.

Club career
Djemaouni began his career in the youth ranks of CRB Ferdjioua. In the summer of 2009, he joined USM Blida two days before the end of the transfer period. On September 11, 2009, in just his fourth game with the club, Djemaouni scored his first professional goal in a league match against JSM Béjaïa. He went on to score two more goals in the same game to also record his first hat-trick.

References

External links
 DZFoot Profile
 

1987 births
Living people
Algerian footballers
Algerian Ligue Professionnelle 1 players
USM Blida players
Algerian Ligue 2 players
Association football forwards
21st-century Algerian people